Khin or Kheyn may refer to:
Khin-e Arab
Khin-e Chomaqi